Sadhna (translation: Realize, also transliterated as Sadhana) is a 1958 Black-and-white Social guidance Hindi film produced and directed by B. R. Chopra. The film stars Sunil Dutt and Vyjayanthimala in the lead with Leela Chitnis, Radhakrishan, Manmohan Krishna, Uma Dutt and Ravikant, forming an ensemble cast. The story, screenplay and dialogue was penned by Mukhram Sharma. The film revolves around Rajini (Vyjayanthimala), a prostitute, and her love affair with a professor (Sunil Dutt).

Theme
The film has a theme on the rehabilitation of prostitutes, which was then a controversial topic. Furthermore, the film also questioned society's view of prostitution.

Synopsis
The story revolves around professor Mohan, who lives with his ailing mother and his mother would like him to get married, but he was opposed to this. Suddenly, his mother loses consciousness and is not expected to live long and the only way the son has to save her is to get married. So he brings a woman, Rajini, who is then introduced to his mother. Now his mother's health improves and his mother is so happy with Rajini that she even gives her the family jewels. Then the mother and son receive the shattering news that the Rajini is actually a prostitute.

Plot

Professor Mohan (Sunil Dutt) is a morally upright, honest young man living with his beloved mother (Leela Chitnis), who is single-minded in her pursuit of one goal: her son's marriage. Mohan teaches literature and poetry at a nearby college. During one lesson about a nobleman who has fallen for a prostitute, he makes his feelings about dancing girls quite clear.

Not long after, his mother, who is running a fever, falls down the stairs in their home and is unconscious. The doctor is called, injections are given, the neighbors all come crowding in, and much shaking of the head ensues, but she finally regains her senses long enough to say this, that she wants him to get married. The doctor pronounces his judgment that with the medication, she will get better; but the packed-in neighbors are much more gloomy. They all file out, still muttering amongst themselves.

One of the neighbors, Jeevan (Radhakrishan), has creditors hounding him, and he sees a little opportunity to make some money. He tells Mohan that he knows a girl who might be persuaded to pose as his fiancee for a few days, but her father will probably want money. Mohan, of course, is willing at this point to do anything and agrees to give Jeevan whatever he wants. Jeevan goes to see Champabai (Vyjayanthimala), a local prostitute. He negotiates a price with her for posing as Mohan's fiancee for the evening. She puts on a demure sari and he takes her to see his mother and meet Mohan. His mother wakes up long enough to bless her before falling back into a deep sleep.

Champa, for her part, is unimpressed by either mother or son and mocks them when she gets home. Jeevan gives her money, which is promptly pocketed by the brothel owner Lallubhai (Manmohan Krishna).

The next day, Mohan's mom asks to see "Rajni" (also Vyjayanthimala) again, and Mohan asks Jeevan to bring her again that evening—Jeevan has told Mohan that she is the daughter of a distant relative. In any case, Champa / Rajni is bowled over by the expensive jewelry that Mohan's mom shows her as the family bride-to-be. She decides to forgo her fee, to Jeevan's dismay, in favor of pretending to have real feelings for Mohan until she can find an opportunity to steal it. She soon does, as one day Mohan's mom gives her the bridal sari and jewelry to take home and try on.

She puts on her finery for her customers that evening, and they make fun of her. She flees in humiliation and the jewels she put on so happily moments before now feel like they are scalding her. Her customers sing a lively qawwali to try and coax her out. But when she emerges, this time in her dance costume, they laugh at her again and she realizes that she means nothing to them, they don't think of her as a person with feelings or emotions. The next day, subdued, she brings back the jewelry and bridal sari to Ma, who is recovering nicely. Ma's warm greeting and kind affection make her feel even worse.

Meanwhile, Mohan has fallen for Rajni, and he wants to speak to her father. Jeevan puts him off, and he returns home to find Rajni there. He expresses his affection gently, and she tells him that she is not worthy. She leaves sadly, and the next evening refuses to dance for her customers. Lallu's threats don't move her either, and she throws him out after an impassioned speech about how he has been living off her earnings for years. He goes but vows that he will make her dance in the bazaar.

She goes to see Jeevan and makes him promise that he won't tell Mohan the truth about her, not because she thinks she has a future with him, but because she can't bear to become a lesser woman in his eyes. Soon after that, Mohan sees Rajni walking in the street. When he calls her name, she flees, and he follows her to her house. Mohan is horrified and angry when the people of the bazaar tell him that she is Champa and not Rajni. He tells his bewildered mother that he will never see Rajni again.

Champa later writes a letter to Mohan that she wants to see him one last time at midnight outside his house. Mohan tears up the letter but still goes outside to find Champa standing there. He asks her why she wanted to see him and tells her to go away. She tells him that she is Champa and she is very sorry for cheating on both him and his mother. He immediately tells her that her profession is to cheat and betray people as she is a prostitute. She tells him that she was forced to become one but he doesn't pay heed to her. She leaves but gets kidnapped by Lallu but Mohan saves her in the nick of time. He takes her back to her house and helps her regain consciousness. He asks her who they and why they were kidnapping her. She tells him that they were MEN and they don't ask for consent on any matter. She then tells him how she was forced to become a prostitute after she was left alone in the world after her mother died suffering without any medicines. Mohan after hearing this tells her that he will marry her as Champa and not as Rajni. She becomes very delighted to hear this but tells him to go home immediately as she didn't want his mother to get humiliated knowing that her son goes to a prostitute's house.

Meanwhile, Lallu tells Mohan's mother that Rajni is not her but Champaba, a prostitute. She tells him to get out of her house and asks Mohan whether what Lallu said was true or not. Mohan tells her that it is all true which shocks and makes her very angry. At that time, Champa arrives at Mohan's house to take the blessings from Mohan's mother but she refuses to do anything for her. Lallu tells her that she won't get a place anywhere other than her house in the bazaar. Realizing this, Champa tells Lallu, with tears in her eyes, that she neither will be accepted by anyone nor does she deserve any other place than the bazaar. She turns to go out of the house when Mohan's mother stops her and tells her that she will not let her daughter-in-law go anywhere. Champa cries tears of happiness when she hears that she gets accepted by Mohan's mother. The film ends on a happy note with Champa and Mohan reuniting.

Cast

 Sunil Dutt as Professor Mohan
 Vyjayanthimala as Champabai / Champa / Rajni
 Leela Chitnis as Mohan's mother
 Radhakrishan as Jeevan Ram
 Manmohan Krishna as Lallu bai
 Uma Dutt as Pahelwan
 Ravikant as Doctor 
 S.Balber  act on Qawwali Aaj Kyon Humse Parda Hai

Crew
 Art Department
 Sant Singh as the Art director
 R.G. Gaekwad as the assistant art director

 Sound Department
 Jaywant S. Worlikar as the Audiographer
 S. N. Modi as the assistant audiographer
 S. N. Sharma as the assistant audiographer

 Makeup Department
 Shanker Ram Jadhav as the Make-up artist
 Ram Singh as the assistant make-up artist

 Costume and Wardrobe Department
 Vasant as the Costume designer

 Camera and Electrical Department
 Dharam Chopra as the Camera operator
 Roshanlal Sharma as the Unit still photographer
 Vithal Narayan as the Focus puller
 P. R. L. Raman as the Clapper loader

 Editorial Department
 Abba Joshi as the film processing
 Krishnan Sachdeva as the assistant editor

 Second Unit Director or Assistant Director
 O. P. Bedi as the Assistant director
 Yash Chopra as the Assistant director
 Balbir Kumar as the Assistant director

 Other crew
 G. D. Bhadsavle as the Publicist
 Jaikishan as the Production assistant
 Laxmi Narayan Yadav as the Production assistant
 C. L. Kapoor as the Production executive
 C. V. K. Sastry as the Production Controller
 Mohanlal Harkishenlal Sibal as the Presenter
 B. Sohanlal as the Choreographer
 Bhadrakumar Yagnik as the Public relations

Production

Casting
For the lead role of Champa bai, who is a prostitute, the initial consideration for that role was actress Nimmi, but she hesitated to enact a role of a prostitute and rejected the offer, which was instrumental in her career decline by the late 1950s. Later, actress Vyjayanthimala, who previously worked with B.R. Chopra in Naya Daur (1957), agreed to be part of the film immediately after hearing the script from the director. Furthermore, Yash Chopra, the younger brother of B.R. Chopra, was an assistant director during the making of Sadhna. B. R. Chopra later gave him his break as a director the next year with Dhool Ka Phool (1959).

Soundtrack

The film's soundtrack was composed by Datta Naik, who had a breakthrough this album. Later on, he composed some of the best Bollywood songs in the film Dhool Ka Phool (1957) and Aag Aur Daag (1970).

The lyrics were provided by Sahir Ludhianvi and the vocals were provided by Lata Mangeshkar, Mohammed Rafi, S. Balber (musician)|S. Balber, Geeta Dutt and Asha Bhosle.

Reception

Critical
Sadhna received largely positive reviews from critics and was one of the most critically acclaimed films of the year. Vijay Lokapally from The Hindu said: "Among the great movies made on the subject of helpless women versus society, Sadhna holds its own for its realistic portrayal and treatment of a subject, so aesthetically documented by Chopra and Vyjayanthimala". While actress Vyjayanthimala was praised by the reviewer, whose performance was described as "gorgeous when she entertains the clients at her kotha" and "stunningly restrained when she assumes the character of a prospective wife". Adding to that, "she slips in and out of the two challenging and contrasting roles with élan, a remarkable feat for an artiste who was only 22 and hardly 10-films old when she signed to play this difficult but decisive role in her dazzling career" and concluded that "the movie is all about Vyjayanthimala's skills as a dancer and an actor[...]is captivating in her dancing numbers[...]The Filmfare Award for Best Actress that year could not have gone to anyone else even though she was also nominated in the same category for Madhumati."

Similarly, Rediff's reviewer Dinesh Raheja has commented that "Sadhna was quite progressive in its approach, boldly dealt with a prostitute's love story with a literature professor[...]it dared to portray not just the often seen tragic trajectory of a prostitute's life and times, but a happy ending as well". Furthermore, Raheja added that, "Though Chopra's narrative style is conventional, he needs to be commended for attempting a reformist tale". The music director Datta Naik and the lyricist Sahir Ludhianvi were praised for their involvement, especially for "Aurat Ne Janam Diya Mardon Ko", described as "crowning glory" and "hair-raising" song of the film.

Commercial
According to Ibosnetwork.com, the film had grossed at about 8,000,000 and its adjusted to inflation gross is about  2,134 million. The film was the third direct box office hit film for the B. R. Films banner after Ek Hi Raasta (1956 film) and Naya Daur (1957), and the sixth consecutive hit of B.R. Chopra as director after Afsana, Shole and Chandni Chowk. After Sadhna, which made Chopra financially the most-viable banner, the top heroes and heroines were prepared to work with him at half their remuneration for the box office guarantee offered by his banner.

Awards

References

External links
 

1958 films
1950s Hindi-language films
Films about prostitution in India
Films directed by B. R. Chopra
Films scored by Datta Naik